Naqab (also Romanized as Naqāb, Neqāb, and Nakkob) is a village in Titkanlu Rural District, Khabushan District, Faruj County, North Khorasan Province, Iran. At the 2006 census, its population was 532, in 145 families.

References 

Populated places in Faruj County